Cyclocosmia is a genus of mygalomorph trapdoor spiders in the family Halonoproctidae, first described by Anton Ausserer in 1871. Originally placed with the Ctenizidae, when the family split in 2018, this genus was placed with the Halonoproctidae as the type genus. The name is derived from the Greek "kyklos", meaning "circle", and "kosmeo", meaning "to adorn".

Description

These are trapdoor spiders, whose species are distinguished from each other by the pattern of the abdominal disk, the number of hairs on its seam, and the shape of the spermathecae. They have abdomens that are abruptly truncated, ending in a hardened disc that is strengthened by a system of ribs and grooves. They use this to clog the entrance of their burrows when threatened, a phenomenon called phragmosis. The disks have strong spines around the edge, and they each have four spinnerets just anterior to it. The posterior, retractable spinnerets are particularly large.

Species
 it contains ten species:
Cyclocosmia lannaensis Schwendinger, 2005 – China, Thailand
Cyclocosmia latusicosta Zhu, Zhang & Zhang, 2006 – China, Vietnam
Cyclocosmia liui Xu, Xu & Li, 2017 – China
Cyclocosmia loricata (C. L. Koch, 1842) – Mexico
Cyclocosmia ricketti (Pocock, 1901) – China
Cyclocosmia siamensis Schwendinger, 2005 – Thailand, Laos
Cyclocosmia sublatusicosta Yu & Zhang, 2018 – China
Cyclocosmia subricketti Yu & Zhang, 2018 – China
Cyclocosmia torreya Gertsch & Platnick, 1975 – USA
Cyclocosmia truncata (Hentz, 1841) (type) – USA

References

Further reading 
  (2005): Two new Cyclocosmia (Araneae: Ctenizidae) from Thailand. Revue Suisse de Zoologie 112(1): 225-252

External links 

 Cyclocosmia at Bugguide.net
 Cyclocosmia close up

Halonoproctidae
Mygalomorphae genera
Spiders of Asia
Spiders of North America
Taxa named by Anton Ausserer